Neocalyptis molesta is a species of moth of the  family Tortricidae. It is found in Australia, where it has been recorded from Queensland.

The wingspan is about 15 mm. The wings are various shades of brown.

References

	

Moths described in 1910
Neocalyptis